Caitlin Maureen McHugh (born May 13, 1986) is an American actress, writer, and model.

Early life
Born  in Santa Monica, California to Leilani (née Empeno) and Timothy McHugh, she attended Flintridge Sacred Heart Academy in La Cañada Flintridge, California, graduating in 2004. She is of Irish and Filipino ancestry.

Career
She first began to find bit parts in film and television in 2007 with a minor role in I Am Legend, and earned nine more credits over the next six years. In 2014, she portrayed Sloan in the fifth season of the TV series The Vampire Diaries. In 2017, she co-wrote the romantic comedy short film Ingenue-ish with fellow actor John Stamos, who also co-starred with her.

McHugh is signed with Wilhelmina Models. In 2016, she appeared in television commercials for Colgate toothpaste and the following year, for Buick SUVs.

Personal life
McHugh married restaurateur Massimo Lusardi on June 3, 2011. They separated a few months later and divorced in 2014.

In 2011, McHugh met actor John Stamos when they both guest-starred on an episode of Law & Order: Special Victims Unit. They began dating in 2016 and became engaged in October 2017.  They married in February 2018, and their son was born in April 2018.

References

External links

American female models
American models of Filipino descent
American people of Irish descent
Living people
University of North Carolina School of the Arts alumni
Actresses from Santa Monica, California
Writers from Santa Monica, California
Female models from California
21st-century American women
Year of birth missing (living people)